Karl-Heinz Fuhrmann (born 18 May 1937) is a German equestrian. He competed at the 1964 Summer Olympics and the 1968 Summer Olympics.

References

1937 births
Living people
German male equestrians
Olympic equestrians of the United Team of Germany
Olympic equestrians of East Germany
Equestrians at the 1964 Summer Olympics
Equestrians at the 1968 Summer Olympics